Taylor Nelson (born May 3, 1988) is a Canadian former professional ice hockey goaltender. He most recently played for the Wichita Thunder in the then CHL.

Nelson came to Ferris State University after he first played junior hockey in the Saskatchewan Junior Hockey League with the Humboldt Broncos before committing to Ferris State University of the NCAA's Division I in the Central Collegiate Hockey Association (CCHA) conference.

Undrafted, Nelson was signed to his first professional contract with the Worcester Sharks of the American Hockey League on August 29, 2012. After attending Worcester's training camp for the 2012–13 season, Nelson was reassigned to ECHL affiliate, the San Francisco Bulls to begin the year.

Awards and honours

References

External links

1988 births
Living people
Canadian ice hockey goaltenders
Ferris State Bulldogs men's ice hockey players
Humboldt Broncos players
Ice hockey people from Ontario
San Francisco Bulls players
Sportspeople from Regina, Saskatchewan
Wichita Thunder players
AHCA Division I men's ice hockey All-Americans